The Kaohsiung Mosque is a mosque in Lingya District, Kaohsiung, Taiwan. It is the second mosque to be built in Taiwan after Taipei Grand Mosque in Taipei.

History

First building

Kaohsiung Mosque was built in 1949 in Taiwan by Muslim nationalists after their defeat against the communists in the Chinese civil war. In the beginning, Muslim public officers worked with the Kuomintang government to suggest the construction of a new mosque in Taiwan and started to raise funds from January 1949. Initially, they rented a 270 square meters of space at 117 Wufu 4th (五福四) Road in Yancheng District as a temporary location.

Second building
Due to the limited space available at 117 Wufu 4th Road, they moved to a 460 square meters Japanese wooden style building at 196 Linsen 1st (林森一) Road in Sinsing District in 1951. The main prayer hall area was 135 square meter. With the growing number of Muslim worshipers, they started to raise funds for the new mosque. In October 1988, the land of the old mosque were sold and the money they received was used to finance the construction of the new mosque. 196 Linsen 1st Road now houses FarEasTone customer care service center.

Current building

In February 1990, they finally moved the mosque to the current bigger site and better equipped building to accommodate their growing numbers of Muslims located at 11 Jianjun (建軍) Road in Lingya District. Construction started on 17 December 1990, completed in late December 1991 and it was opened in April 1992. It costed US$1,900,000.

Architecture

Kaohsiung Mosque is a three-story building that features a large Middle Eastern vault. The design of the prayer hall, nooks, corners and components of the buildings are based on traditional mosques in the Middle East. The building covers an area of 2,657 square meters.

The first floor is the male and female dormitories, female prayer room and female activity center. The second floor is the main prayer hall, study center for Arabic language and Islamic culture display room. The third floor is the guest room, youth activity center, office and kitchen. The mosque also features the imam office, administration office, library and ablution area.

Beside the mosque there are some Halal restaurants owned by Muslim people.

Transportation
Kaohsiung Mosque is accessible within walking distance North from Weiwuying Station of the Kaohsiung MRT.

See also
 Islam in Taiwan
 Chinese Muslim Association
 Chinese Muslim Youth League
 List of mosques in Taiwan

References

External links

  
 YouTube - Kaohsiung Mosque 
 TouTube - 53rd Anniversary of Kaohsiung Mosque 

1949 establishments in Taiwan
Mosques in Taiwan
Mosques completed in 1992
Rebuilt buildings and structures in Taiwan
Religious buildings and structures in Kaohsiung